Pun Shan Chau is a village in Tai Po District, Hong Kong.

Administration
Pun Shan Chau is a recognized village under the New Territories Small House Policy.

References

External links

 Delineation of area of existing village Pun Shan Chau (Tai Po) for election of resident representative (2019 to 2022)

Villages in Tai Po District, Hong Kong